Robert Crichton may refer to:
Robert Crichton (bishop) (died 1585), Scottish Catholic cleric
Robert Crichton (Lord Advocate) (1530–1582), Lord Advocate of Scotland
Robert Crichton, 6th Lord Crichton of Sanquhar (died 1561)
Robert Crichton, 8th Lord Crichton of Sanquhar (died 1612), son of Edward, Lord Sanquhar
Robert Crichton (novelist) (1925–1993), American novelist
Robert Crichton (comics), a supporting character in DC Comics

See also
For the Lords Crichton of Sanquhar see Earl of Dumfries